Turnpike trusts were bodies set up by Acts of Parliament in the United Kingdom during the 18th and 19th centuries. The trusts had powers to collect road tolls for the maintenance of principal highways. The length of turnpike roads within what is now Greater Manchester varied considerably, from the  Little Lever Trust, to the  Manchester to Saltersbrook Trust.

Turnpikes contributed significantly to England's economic development before and during the Industrial Revolution. Although the trusts were abolished in the late-19th century, the roads themselves broadly remain as modern routes, and some of the original toll houses and roadside milestones have survived.

The metropolitan county of Greater Manchester was created in 1974 and so the turnpike trusts predate its existence. Greater Manchester lies at the conjunction of the historic county boundaries of Cheshire, Derbyshire, Lancashire and Yorkshire; many trusts operated roads which crossed those ancient county boundaries. The list below is divided according to historic county, with the first part of the name of each trust determining which table it appears in.

History

Method of construction and the design of the road surface varied. Before construction of its road, the Bury, Blackburn and Whalley Trust engaged "skilled persons" as temporary surveyors, to make a survey of the districts through which the road would pass. It then advertised for tenders for construction of varied parts of the roads, with contractors responsible for building their respective portions, under the supervision of permanent surveyors. The trust bought limestone for the road surface largely from limestone quarries in Clitheroe. In Manchester, Liverpool, and Wigan, due to heavy coal traffic it was necessary to lay pavements of large stones along the roads. Suitable material would, if not found in the vicinity, be imported from the coasts of Wales and Scotland. Normally the pavement ran down the middle of the road, with a gravelled way on either side. Such pavements were expensive, and unpopular with travellers who regularly described their discomfort travelling upon them.

Toll rates varied across the region, but preferential rates were often available to local residents, and for particular kinds of local traffic.  The 1819 Act of the Crossford Bridge and Manchester Trust allowed it to charge half tolls on the inhabitants and occupiers of Trafford House, Old Trafford, and Stretford Moss.  The Bolton and Westhoughton Trust allowed farmers from Rumworth and Westhoughton to use the roads free of charge, when taking horses and carts laden with produce from their own farms  to Bolton Market.  Carriage of coal was often charged at half the normal rate, and no tolls were payable by persons travelling on foot.  Other road users who were entitled to free passage included posthorses, carriage of ordnance and military stores, and cattle going to pasture.

Turnpike roads had a huge impact on the nature of business transport around Manchester.  Packhorses were superseded by waggons, and merchants would no longer accompany their caravans to markets and fairs, instead sending agents with samples, and despatching the goods at a later date.  In 1804 it was said that Manchester employed more than 120 "land carriers".

The railway era spelt disaster for most turnpike trusts.  Although some trusts in districts not served by railways managed to increase revenue, most did not.  In 1829, the year before the Liverpool and Manchester Railway opened, the Warrington and Lower Irlam Trust had receipts of £1,680, but by 1834 this had fallen to £332.  The Bolton and Blackburn Trust had an income of £3,998 in 1846, but in 1847 following the completion of a railway between the two towns this had fallen to £3,077, and in 1849 £1,185.

The end of the turnpike system created serious problems for the local parishes and highway district boards upon whom the burden of maintenance fell. The Local Government Act 1888 made the repair of all main roads the responsibility of the new county councils. Lancashire County Council determined that any road leading to a town with a population of 25,000 or more would become a main road, which included almost all of the old turnpike roads in the region.

Cheshire

Derbyshire

Lancashire

Yorkshire

References

Notes

Bibliography

 
 
 
 
 
 
 

Turnpike roads in the United Kingdom
Roads in Greater Manchester
History of Greater Manchester
History of transport in Greater Manchester